Nhlanhla Brilliant Khuzwayo (born 9 February 1990) is a South African retired international footballer who played as a goalkeeper.

Career 
Khuzwayo joined AmaZulu from Durban Warriors in 2010. He made his debut on 22 September 2010 against Platinum Stars in a 2–2 draw. Khuzwayo played two more league games to finish with a total of 3. He was loaned to National First Division club Thanda Royal Zulu. Khuzwayo joined Chiefs at the end of the 2011–12 season signing a three-year contract which was finalised on 24 May 2012. On 23 May 2012, the day before Khuzwayo signed, AmaZulu general manager Peter O'Connor suggested it was in the player's best interest that the club agreed to let him join Chiefs. "Seeing that Tapuwa Kapini has another three years with us, it was agreed that we would release 'Casillas' [Khuzwayo] because he wouldn't be playing as the first-choice goalkeeper. So to enable him to get more game-time we have decided to allow him to join Chiefs after they had approached us for his services," He made his debut on 28 April 2013 against Platinum Stars at the Peter Mokaba Stadium. The match was billed as the title decider but ended 0–0. He won the league and cup double with Chiefs. In the 2013–14 season he played four matches. He played in a 2–0 win over Golden Arrows in the league, another 2–0 against AS Vita in the CAF Champions League, a 1–0 win over Black Leopards and a 2–1 win over FC Buffalo, both in the Nedbank Cup. In the 2014–15 season he played his first league match in a 2–1 win over University of Pretoria conceding his first league goal since joining Chiefs. Ahead of the eagerly anticipated MTN 8 final, Khuzwayo was the favourite to be the goalkeeper in the absence of Itumeleng Khune. Coach Stuart Baxter said "Itu is one of our top players, and of course we'll miss him. If my Lamborghini isn't working today then maybe I have to take the old Porsche. One of our 'keepers has now got to be a Porsche, maybe he's not a Lamborghini just yet, but he can be that Porsche. Lets see if they step up." In his Soweto derby debut on 20 September 2014, despite being written off as the "weakest link", Khuzwayo made numerous saves in Chiefs' 1–0 win over Orlando Pirates in the MTN 8 Final at the Moses Mabhida Stadium in Durbanhis hometown, and he thanked everyone at the club, most notably Khune, after he received the Man of the Match award. "First and foremost I'd like to thank my family, my brothers, my friends, everyone who believed in me, Itumeleng Khune, he was motivating me all the time since I came to Kaizer Chiefs, he's just an inspiration to me,"

After his agent initially denied the rumours that he was going to a return due to a knee injury in June 2019, he retired due to injury in July 2019, aged 29 and having never represented Orlando Pirates in a league match.

International career
Khuzwayo has 29 U-23 caps. He got his first call-up in 2010 for a two-match tour in Tehran He made his international debut for South Africa on 6 January 2012 against Equatorial Guinea.

Personal life
Khuzwayo wears no. 16 because of his late mother who died in 2006 when he was aged 16. On 20 September 2014 during the 2014 MTN 8 Final, Khuzwayo's family home in P-section Umlazi was robbed. His aunt, Sibongile Khuzwayo wrote on a social network that only money and cellphones stolen and TV sets and other furniture was not stolen. The matter was not reported, choosing to approach their security company.

References

1990 births
Living people
South African soccer players
South Africa international soccer players
Association football goalkeepers
AmaZulu F.C. players
Kaizer Chiefs F.C. players
Thanda Royal Zulu F.C. players
Sportspeople from Durban
2015 Africa Cup of Nations players
African Games silver medalists for South Africa
African Games medalists in football
Competitors at the 2011 All-Africa Games